James Strohn Copley (August 12, 1916 – October 6, 1973) was a journalist and newspaper publisher. He published the San Diego Union and the San Diego Evening Tribune, both later merged into The San Diego Union-Tribune in 1992, from 1947 until his death in 1973, and was President of the Inter American Press Association (1969 - 1970). His politics was "unabashedly conservative, Republican and pro-American". He had close associations with leading Republican of the era, including Barry Goldwater, Richard Nixon and Spiro Agnew. Copley's presence was a chief reason that the Republican National Convention of 1972 was originally planned to be in San Diego.

Copley was born in St. Johnsville, New York, the son of Flora and John Lodwell. His parents died in the Influenza epidemic of 1917-1918. Copley was adopted at age four by Col. Ira Clifton Copley, who later (in 1928) bought The San Diego Union and the San Diego Evening Tribune. Copley graduated from Yale University in 1939. At Yale, he served on the business staff of campus humor magazine The Yale Record with Roy D. Chapin, Jr. and Walter J. Cummings, Jr. After college, he went into journalism, becoming the CEO of the Union-Tribune group on Ira Copley's death in 1947. He remained CEO until his death in 1973, when his wife, Helen K. Copley, took over. The Union and the Tribune merged in 1992 to become The San Diego Union-Tribune. The Copley Press also published smaller papers in California and the Midwest, including the Torrance, California Daily Breeze, San Pedro, California News-Pilot, Aurora, Illinois Beacon-News, and the Burbank, California Daily Review.

According to Carl Bernstein, Copley, as CEO of Copley Press, cooperated with the Central Intelligence Agency, which had widespread contacts in the United States media.

The University of San Diego has a library named in honor of Copley and his wife (the Helen K. and James S. Copley Library). Copley resided in La Jolla, California, and often stayed at a second home in Borrego Springs, California.

References

1910s births
1973 deaths
American adoptees
American male journalists
Maria Moors Cabot Prize winners
Copley family
20th-century American newspaper publishers (people)
People from La Jolla, San Diego
People from Borrego Springs, California
20th-century American journalists
United States Navy personnel of World War II